The 1981–82 World Series was a One Day International (ODI) cricket tri-series where Australia played host to Pakistan and West Indies. Australia and West Indies reached the Finals, which West Indies won 3–1.

Points table

Group stage

Final series
West Indies won the best of five final series against Australia 3–1.

1st Final

2nd Final

3rd Final

4th Final

References

1981 in Australian cricket
1981 in Pakistani cricket
1981–82 Australian cricket season
1982 in Australian cricket
1982 in Pakistani cricket
1981
International cricket competitions from 1980–81 to 1985
1981–82
1981–82